Danie Theron Combat School  was a light infantry training regiment of the South African Army. It formed part of the South African Army Infantry Formation as well as the South African Territorial Reserve.

History

Origin
Danie Theron Combat School was established near Kimberley around 1967, aimed at primary infantry training for the Commando system. The school was initially called the Commando Combat School, but by 1968 was renamed in honour of Danie Theron, a renowned Boer war soldier.

Operations
The School was initially responsible for basic military training. The majority of the recruits were area bound farmers, business owners, or essentials services). These recruits were to be allocated to regional commandos after their initial training.

The school was also responsible for promotional training of Civilian Force officers and non-commissioned officers.

Other training modules include conventional and rural counter insurgency training.

By 1973, the majority of the Danie Theron Combat School training/recruit wing staff were transferred to a new unit 11 Commando (South African).

Promotional and Corp specific Training was eventually transferred to other Infantry schools by the mid 1980s.

Unit Insignia

Leadership

References

See also 
 South African Commando System

South African Commando Units